Western Eagles FC is an Australian football (soccer) club based in the western suburbs of Melbourne, Victoria.

The club's foundation meeting was held on 13 August 1950, at 93 Brighton Road, St. Kilda Victoria. The meeting decided that the club would be known as "Polonia Soccer Club".

KS Polonia was one of the powerhouses of Victorian and Australian soccer in the 1950s and 1960s, before making a brief revival in the 1980s. The club has since fallen to the lower reaches of the Victorian system, and currently participates in the Victorian State League Division 3 North – West.

Club history

Foundation 
With the conclusion of the Second World War, many Poles were unable to, or did not want to return to their homeland for various reasons and as such made the decision to emigrate to Australia and begin a new life for themselves and their families. They were ex-servicemen and women, displaced persons, etc.

As Poles have done for countless generations, they began to form various organisations to uphold their old traditions and their identities, to alleviate their homesickness, finding solace with their own kind in a strange and at times inhospitable new land. Sport has always been a major enjoyment to Poles and as such a Polish Soccer Club was inevitable.

The foundation meeting was held on 13 August 1950 at 93 Brighton Road St Kilda. The Meeting was an initiative of Zdzislaw Zabuski, Boleslaw Mlewski, Jacek Wyszogrodzki and the Polish Association in Victoria. The first committee was elected on 27 August 1950 and consisted of Wladyslaw Kowalik – President, Wiktor Kwiatkowski – Hon. Secretary, Franek Skowronski – Treasurer, Kazimierz Zielinski – Team Manager, Boleslaw Mlewski – Coach, Mieczyslaw Terlikowski – Team Manager. The meeting decided that the club would be named Polonia Sports Club.

The early years 
"Polonia" being Latin for Poland and the colours of white and red adopted. Polonia played its first game in September 1950, against JUST(Division 3 Champions and holders of the Australian World Cup) and defeated them 4:3. The club's first official league game took place at Williamstown Racecourse, on 7 April 1951 defeating Geelong United 3:1. It was the beginning of a meteoric climb and the beginning of the golden fifties and sixties for the club. Polonia became 4th Division Champions in their first season of existence in 1951, and 3rd Division Champions in 1952 winning the league without dropping a single point ! In 1953 Polonia finished Division 2 Runners-up winning promotion to Division 1, and becoming World Cup Champions. Players, who starred in these early days and will be remembered by many were Stefan Czauderna and Boleslaw Zablocki, pivot for the Victorian team that played the touring England team in 1951 at the Melbourne Cricket Ground. Stasek Galecki was the best left wing in the State of Victoria at the time, and Augus Dziura, a fine goal scoring center forward.

By 1954 Polonia had climbed into the First Division, losing just one league game in 3 years. It had taken only four years to get from the bottom to the top of the Victorian soccer pyramid structure.

The club reached the Dockerty Cup final for the first time in their history in 1955. The final played on 22 October, at Ascot Vale ended with a 1:1 draw to Hakoah, with the opening goal from Polonia's Peter Schipperheyn in the 51-minute. The side lost the Cup final replay 2:0 on 5 November.

During its early years the club was fortunate to secure services of Zdzislaw Zabuski, an engineer and businessman, and the club's most loyal supporter, who provided employment for many of the Polonia players. His knowledge of local conditions proved extremely useful. Mr Zabuski was elected club President in 1951.

Julian Chrzanowski was one of the club's first committee members and players. Mr Chrzanowski was a member of the Polish Resistance in World War II, before he was captured and send to Auschwitz concentration camp. He barely survived and was offered the chance to migrate to Australia or the United States. He arrived to Australia in 1949. He became the foundation member of Polonia. He played in the club's first game, and was a member of the championship teams of 1951 and 1952.

W.R.Thomas, President of Victorian Soccer Football Association was Polonia's most influential and noteworthy supporters. He recalls in 1951, prior of taking the Victoria State team on tour of New Zealand, arranging with Polonia club President Zdzislaw Zabuski, to play a trail game against the newly formed Polonia Soccer Club. He was shocked when the lowly and newly formed fourth Division team soundly beat his Touring team 7:1. He then became one of the club's great followers, even with his son, Brian, was a playing member of Polonia first team, representing the club in the 1954 season, debuting in Division One.

In 1956, the year of the Melbourne Olympic Games, Polonia officials took the opportunity to approach visiting membersof the Polish Olympic Committee who agreed
to allow some of Poland's best players to come to Melbourne. Polonia was fortunate to have amongst its ranks, the dynamic figure of Ted Lezon, a person gifted with explosive energy and controversial temperament which gave the Club plenty of drive and lift and who to this day is still an influence to the present. In 1956, Ted Lezon was entertaining officials of the Polish Olympic Teams and jokingly said "What about Polonia getting some top class players from Poland", that remark set the ball rolling, Dr Charles Walker, who was Club president at the time, had influential connections in Poland and the joke became reality.

Dr. Charles Walker was a Polish doctor born in Lviv, Poland. Dr Walker arrived in Australia just before the Second World War, and as a doctor was part of the Australian Army Force that combat against the Japanese in Papua New Guinea. Dr Walker began his work with the club in 1950 as a medical volunteer. By 1952 he was elected club President, role he fulfilled in the following years ; 1953, 1955–1956, 1958–1963.

On 13 June 1959, the first five of a long line of Polish stars arrived in Melbourne. They were Roch Dronia, Ryszard Szczepanski, Kaz Szygalski, Marian Gasior and Wieslaw Janczyk.

The highlight era in the club's history, were the early 1960s. In the season of 1960 and 1961 Polonia won back to back State League Championship, and becoming 1961 Dockerty Cup Winners beating George Cross 4:2 in the Final on 7 October, at Olympic Park with goals from Zygmund Gross, Zdzislaw Maruszkiewicz and a brace from Mieczyslaw Jurecki. This most successful side in the club's history also won the prestige "World Cup" tournament. Some of the most influential players of that time were; Mieczyslaw Jurecki, Wieslaw Janczyk, Wieslaw Gamaj, Zdzislaw Maruszkiewicz, Jerzy Dudon, Charlie Morks, Marian Gasior, Remo Guardiani, Ryszard Szczepanski, Roch Dronia, Kazimierz Szygalski, Zygmunt Gross, Henryk Gronowski, Ference Voros. President of Polonia SC at that time was Dr. Charles Walker. Our club also had representatives at international level. Players that had the honor to represent the Australian national team were George Pittoni, Lolly Vella and Robert Wemyss. Mieczyslaw Jurecki and Kazimierz Kowalec had the opportunity to play in the Australian "B" team. There was a number of players that were Poland's national team representatives ; Wieslaw Janczyk, Edward Jankowski, Zygmunt Gadecki, Norbert Gajda, Henryk and Robert Gronowski, Mieczyslaw Jurecki, Edmund Zientara.

In 1963 Polonia finished Runners-up in three competitions. In the Victorian State League, two points behind JUST, taking just 3 points in their final four games. The State League Leading Goalscorer that season was Edward Jankowski with 21 goals. Same year Polonia lost in the Final of the Dockerty Cup to ... JUST, losing 2:4 at Olympic Park. The team also lost in the Final of Australia Cup, which was the first national club tournament in the country initiated in 1962. The 1963 final was contested by two Melbourne clubs, with Slavia Melbourne beating Polonia 3:2 in a replay, after a scoreless draw in the first game. In the final replay, Des Palmer scored a hat-trick for the winners. On its way to the final Polonia faced Adelaide Juventus, George Cross, Brisbane Azzuri, and Sydney Prague in the semi-final, winning 3:1. Polonia did manage to win the 1963 Ampol Cup, pre-season competition, beating South Melbourne Hellas in the Final.

In 1981, 20 years after winning their last league title, Polonia finally topped the Victorian Metropolitan League Division 1, clinching a place back into the State League after a 4-year absence. The outstanding players of that team were Leszek Dzielakowski, Richard Lipiarski, Marian Jaworski, John Wallace, Greg Gamanski, Brendon Lakic, Tadeusz Krysinski, Peter Chapnik, Richard Sekulski, Stan Klain, Michael Pichner and Alex Marshall. In charge of the team was Kaz Kowalec, a former great player himself.

Stefan Mila was awarded the 1983 Victorian State League Gold Medal – Player of the Year Award.
The 1984 season Polonia finished Runners-up in the State League ending the season three points behind Morwell Falcons, and reaching the Dockerty Cup Final, losing to Fawkner 3:2 after extra time. Same year Janusz Przybyla was the State League's top Goalscorer netting 23 goals, despite been out injured for five games.

In 1987 Maribyrnong Polonia won its third Victorian State Championship. The team finished on top of the league with 42 points, three-point ahead of Green Gully. The club's woes began the following season. Due to poor management of the club's finances and by overpaying most of its players, the club had no choice but to start selling its best players. From 1989 to 1992 Polonia suffered successive relegations.

Polonia has been gifted with having some of the most influential people in Polish circles amongst its ranks, the likes of Ted Lezon, who has served in every capacity within the club and is accredited with single-handedly saving the club from extinction, soon after its glorious 1987 State League Championship Win. He has been a mentor to many of the present committee and still casts his long shadow today. The late Tomasz Ostrowski, gifted writer, journalist, philosopher extraordinary and Champion of Polish causes.
Polonia secured approval to play its matches at Maribyrnong at the old Tracy Speedway venue and in an effort to assimilate with the local community renamed themselves "Polonia Maribyrnong Soccer Club". They remained at this venue until 1991, at which time they moved to the Polish Sports and Recreation Centre, Albion where facilities were created for their permanent stay.

Polonia has always been a force to contend with in Victorian Soccer circles and has won countless titles. Polonia won the Victorian Championship on three occasions, in the seasons of 1960, 1961 and 1987.

1998–2019 
Since 1998 Polonia is known as Western Eagles Football Club, changing club name from Sunshine Heights, which the club has been known as from 1991, after the move to the club's new home at Albion, a privately own venue based in the western suburbs of Melbourne. The "Polonia" being dropped as a requirement of the Victorian Soccer Federation to shed their ethnic appeal in 1992.

One of the darkest chapters in the club's history was the disastrous merger venture with Melbourne City. For reasons not known or understood to this day by many supporters, the club's committee made a decision to merge with and compete as Melbourne City in the Victorian State League Division 1 in the 1999 season. In the 2000 season due to the legacy of that merger Western Eagles found themselves in the Victorian Provisional League Division 3. With new club President Darren Bednarski, who embed new life to the club and with the appointment of Leszek Dzielakowski as head coach, the club started a brief revival with three promotions in five years, rising from Provisional League Division 3 to Victorian State League Division 3, where the club finished in 8th position in the 2005 season, coached by Milorad Gelic. In this period the Club won its first league Championship in 16 years, topping the Victorian Provisional League Division 2 in 2003 on 46 points – 5 points ahead of Ballarat. This was the first year the club was in charge by the new Club President – Tadeusz Ziegler.

The 2006 season was disastrous. The club was hit by crisis after crisis, coaching changes and a player walkout, which saw the club relegated back to Provisional League.

Wojciech Laskowski was elected Club President in 2010, the year the club was celebrating its 60th year of existence. The team coached by Sinisa Opacic became Provisional League 2 champions, topping the league table with 44 points. On 6 August 2011 the club organised a 60th Anniversary Gala where the Eagles had over 200 supporters gather, with former greats and the current team members at the Polish Sport and Recreation Centre. They spoke about legends of years past, relived the glory years and discuss the current club situation.

The club's head coach for the 2013 and 2014 season was Srecko Baresic-Nikic, a former professional player himself in Europe. He, together with the club committee and players, planned to bring Western Eagles back on the Victorian football map. The 2013 season Eagles finished 5th on the table with 32 points, and still manage to win promotion to Division 3 due to the new competition format for state level football in Victoria, ending the season with a 3:1 win over league champions Corio. The team also had a solid run in the 2013 edition of the FFV State Knockout Cup were the club reached Round 5, going down to Preston Lions 1:2, after an entertaining game at Albion. The team played throughout the 2013 season facing many injury problems, giving a chance to play many of the club's youth players, one of them being Thomas Deng, who in 2014 signed with the A-League Club Melbourne Victory and made his first international appearance for Australia Under-20 side. Deng made his senior football debut for Western Eagles against Williamstown. Kacper Hubiak became the club's top goalscorer for the fourth consecutive season, with 15 goals, first player to do so in the club's 63-year history. Despite a solid start to the 2014 season where Eagles were sitting in second position in the table after Round 8 with 16 points, the team had a disappointing end to the year losing the last 4 games, including a crushing 8:1 defeat in round 20 to the league champions Essendon Royals. It was the third biggest league defeat in the club's history.

Since the 2000 season, the club is fortunate to have a dynamic, hardworking and controversial figure amongst its ranks, a former player himself, Mark Szpakolski, who gives the club plenty of drive and passion. The likes of Joe Gorczynski, Janusz Przybyla, Leszek Dzielakowski and Wladyslaw Pejko, who are supporting the club by providing constructive and positive influence to others involved. Also, the supportive role of Steve Janus, who was one of the club's major sponsors for more than 15 years.

At the beginning of the 2016 season the club committee and its junior players, was presented with a cheque from Hyundai Australia as part of the "Goals For Grassroots" program. The presentation took place at Etihad Stadium before the A-League fixture between Melbourne Victory and Western Sydney Wanderers. A dismal run of form saw the team slip to the bottom of the league table with only 6 points from its opening 10 games of the 2016 season. The Eagles rally in the second half of the season to finished in 10th place with 23 points. The side's relegation was confirmed by a lost in the relegation playoff to FC Strathmore 1:0, by a way of a penalty kick in the first half, on 24 September, at Paisley Park.

On 15 July 2017 the club's 1500th league game celebration took place at Albion. On this historic occasion the team under Daniel Krasic responded and made the club proud with a 2:1 win over Altona North, courtesy of a Matthew Lodkowski and Jack Karyakos goals. On the day the club's oldest player Stefan Czauderna (90) who walked out with our youngest junior player, lead the senior team out to the pitch. Members of local government and Brimbank Council, Honorable Consul for the Republic of Poland – Dr George J. Luk, Secretary of the SPK Victoria – Bogdan Platek, club members, former players and coaches, sponsors and supporters, all gathered to celebrate the club's achievement. Polonia finished the season in 8th place.

The club appointed Patrick Mangion as the new coach during the 2018 pre-season, who replaced Danny Krasic in mid March. After a 1:1 draw against Altona North in round 4, Eagles won nine games in a row. During this time they secured first position and held it for the remainder of the season. Western Eagles managed to secure the State League 4 Championship of the 2018 season after only 18 rounds. Eagles claimed the title in front of their home fans on 4 August, beating Truganina Hornets 2:1, having come from being 1:0 down: Matthew Lodkowski equalized in the 69th minute of the game and Stefan Dimeski scored the winner three minutes before full-time. Matthew Lodkowski became the leading goalscorer in State League Division 4 with 32 goals for the season, surpassing Janusz Przybyla tally of 23 (State League), and making him Western Eagles highest goalscorer in a single season. Western Eagles won the 2018 Division 4 season with a nine-point margin.

2020– 
In October 2019, the club announced Steve Iosifidis. as the new senior coach for the 2020 season. Iosifidis a former professional player, back-to-back NSL titles winner with South Melbourne under Ange Postecoglou. All Victorian football competitions in 2020 were cancelled due to the impacts from the COVID-19 pandemic in Australia.
The 2021 season is being disrupted due to the impacts from the COVID-19 pandemic in Australia, with the season being suspended from August 2021 from government-imposed lockdowns, with promotion and relegation suspended.

Club name changes

Honours

League 

 Victorian State League
 Champions (3): 1960, 1961, 1987
 Runners-Up (4) : 1955, 1963, 1968, 1984
 Victorian State League Division 1
 Champions (1) : 1981
 Runners-Up (1) : 1979
 Victorian State League Division 2
 Runners-Up (1) : 1953
 Victorian State League Division 3
 Champions (1) : 1952
 Victorian State League Division 4
 Champions (2) : 1951, 2018
 Victorian Provisional League 2 (North-West)
 Champions (2) : 2003, 2010
  Victorian Provisional League 3 (North-West)
 Runners-Up (1) : 2000

Cup 

National

Australia Cup
 Runners-up  (1) : 1963

State

 Dockerty Cup 
 Winners (1) : 1961
 Runners-Up (4) : 1955, 1963, 1976, 1984
State League Cup
 Winners (1) : 1960
 Ampol Cup
 Winners (2) : 1963, 1964
 Buffalo Cup
 Winners (1) : 1984
 Laidlaw World Cup
 Winners (2) : 1953, 1961
 Armstrong Cup
 Winners (3) : 1957, 1959, 1973

Women 

Victorian Women's State League Division 2
Champions (1) : 2012
Runners-up (1) : 2011
Victorian Women's State League Division 3
 Champions (1) : 2008
Victorian Women's State League Division 5
Runners-Up (1) : 2022
Victorian Women's Metropolitan League (North-West)
 Runners-up (1) : 2007

Individual honours 
Victorian State League Gold Medal – Player of the Year
1983 – Stefan Mila
Bill Fleming Medal
1956 – Robert Wemyss
1960 – Wieslaw Janczyk
Sporting Globe Medal
1960 – Wieslaw Janczyk
1961 – Mieczyslaw Jurecki
1962 - Stanislaw Szklarek
Victorian Provisional League 2 Best & Fairest
2002 - Alex Samayoa

Victorian State League Leading Goal Scorer
1961 – Mieczyslaw Jurecki 17 goals
1963 – Edward Jankowski 21 goals
1984 – Janusz Przybyla 23 goals
Victorian State League Division 1 Leading Goal Scorer 
1981 - Tadeusz Krysinski 14 goals
Victorian State League Division 3 Leading Goal Scorer 
1952 - Julian Chrzanowski
Victorian State League Division 4 Leading Goal Scorer
1951 - Julian Chrzanowski
2018 - Matthew Lodkowski 32 goals

International Representatives 
 Thomas Deng
 George Pittoni
 Danny Tiatto
 Lolly Vella
 Robert Wemyss
Janusz Baran
Zygmunt Gadecki
Norbert Gajda
Henryk Gronowski
Robert Gronowski
 Wiesław Jańczyk
 Edward Jankowski
 Zdzislaw Kostrzewa
Eugeniusz Lerch
 Edmund Zientara

Notable Former Coaches 
Wieslaw Janczyk 1960–61, 1965–66
Edmund Zientara 1964
  Kazimierz Kowalec 1968–1972, 1980–82
 Eugeniusz Lerch 1975–76
  Edward Widera 1978, 2009
  Leszek Dzielakowski 1983, 1989, 2000–01, 2016
Miron Bleiberg 1986–87
  Janusz Przybyla 1988–1990, 1998, 2002
 Milorad Gelic 2005, 2014
Srecko Baresic – Nikic 2013–14
  Steve Iosifidis 2020–2022

Club Presidents

Western Eagles Divisional history 

 Total games played 1585 – W 665 – D 351 – L 569 GF 2655 GA 2217 in 70 seasons 
Divisional History source from OzFootball.net (1951–2010)

All-time table 

Australian football (soccer) league system

Records 
Best Result in the Victorian State League: 8–0 vs Brighton at Maribyrnong Reserve 29 March 1958, 8–0 vs South Melbourne Hellas at Middle Park Soccer Stadium 21 May 1983
Worst Result in the Victorian State League : 0–9 vs Green Gully at Green Gully Reserve 27 August 1989
Best Crowd in League Competition Victorian State League : 20,000 vs South Melbourne Hellas at Olympic Park 21 July 1963
Best Result in the FFV State Knockout Cup/Dockerty Cup : 12–2 vs Pucka Rovers 30 August 1952
Worst Result in the FFV State Knockout Cup/Dockerty Cup : 0–7 vs Frankston Pines at Polish Sports Centre Albion 12 February 1995
Most Points in a Season : 53 points in 2018
Most Wins in a Season : 18 wins in 1952 and 1987
Most Goals in a Seasons : 89 goals in 1952
Biggest Winning Streak : 28 games – from Round 7 1951 to Round 2 1953
Biggest Losing Streak : 8 games – from Round 7 1986 to Round 14 1986
Biggest Unbeaten Streak : 40 games – from Round 1 1951 to Round 8 1953

Western Eagles – Polonia – Championship Teams

Cup Competition

Dockerty Cup Finals

Top Goal Scorers 

1951 Julian Chrzanowski
1952 Julian Chrzanowski
1953 Harry Capobus/Stan Plekan
1954 unknown
1955 Peter Schipperheyn 14
1956 George Pittoni 18
1957 N. von Nagy 8
1958 unknown
1959 Enzo Bottari/Roch Dronia 5
1960 Mieczyslaw Jurecki 12
1961 Mieczyslaw Jurecki 17
1962 Robert Gronowski 6
1963 Edward Jankowski 21
1964 Kazimierz Kowalec 13
1965 Kazimierz Kowalec/Czeslaw Plaskota 4
1966 Stefan Katolik 7
1967 Bernard Przybylski 9
1968 Zygmunt Gadecki/Jerzy Swoboda 7
1969 Henryk Siwka 9

1970 Edward Widera 7
1971 Czeslaw Plaskota/Henryk Siwka 6
1972 Czeslaw Plaskota/Edward Widera 5
1973 Ron Horfiniak 5
1974 Andrew Czapnik/Marian Jaworski 5
1975 Eugeniusz Lerch 5
1976 Hugh Humphreys 5
1977 Tomasz Koter 4
1978 Ralph Esposito 5
1979 Richard Sekulski 14
1980 Tadeusz Krysinski 13
1981 Tadeusz Krysinski 14
1982 Alex Marshall 12
1983 Alex Marshall 12
1984 Janusz Przybyla 23
1985 Greg Warszawski 11
1986 Janusz Przybyla/Alex Marshall 3
1987 Kees Storm 11
1988 Greg Warszawski 11
1989 Bogdan Bonk 8

1990 Bogdan Bonk/Danny Ward 8
1991 Hussein Latif 5
1992 Hussein Latif 7
1993 Hussein Latif 11
1994 Zlate Bogoevski 9
1995 Kamil Gamanski 9
1996 David Beattie 12
1997 Michael Calandrella 14
1998 Kamil Gamanski 8
1999
2000 Paul Dzielakowski 16
2001 Paul Dzielakowski 11
2002 Ivan Devcic 12
2003 Ivan Devcic 13
2004 Konrad Leski 7
2005 Dominic Murdaca 13
2006 Wojciech Galon 3
2007 Konrad Leski 14
2008 Marcin Goralczyk/Mark Grixti 8
2009 John Strycharski 7

2010 Kacper Hubiak 10
2011 Kacper Hubiak 13
2012 Kacper Hubiak/Robert Chelchowski 9
2013 Kacper Hubiak 15
2014 Robert Chelchowski 9
2015 Robert Chelchowski 8
2016 Robert Chelchowski 12
2017 Matthew Lodkowski 10
2018 Matthew Lodkowski 32
2019 Matthew Lodkowski 12
2020
2021 Alister Smart 9
2022 Jason Hayne 11

Longest Serving Players (First Team Appearances)

17 seasons 
Peter Czapnik (1975–1991)
Lukasz Lewinski (1998, 2000–2008, 2010–2011, 2013–2014, 2016–2018)
Mateusz Kowalski (2003–2016, 2018–2019, 2021)

16 seasons 
Andrew Czapnik (1969–1977, 1980–1986)

14 seasons 
Richard Lipiarski (1975–1977, 1979–1989)
Maciej Slodyczka (2005–2010, 2012–2019)

13 seasons 
Edward Marmur (1965–1977)

12 seasons 
Michael Olinowski (1964–1975)
Wojciech Galon (2001–2006, 2010, 2012–2016)
Charles Mizzi (2008–2019)

11 seasons 
Ron Horfiniak (1971–1980, 1983)
Brendon Lakic (1978–1983, 1987–1989, 1994–1995)
Kamil Gamanski (1993–1998, 2001–2005)
Robert Chelchowski (2009–2016, 2018–2019, 2021)

10 seasons 
Henryk Jakubowski (1951–1960)
Czeslaw Plaskota (1964–1973)
Zbigniew Szalinski (1968, 1970–1978)
Marian Jaworski (1971–1977, 1981–1983)
Leszek Dzielakowski (1978–1983, 1985–1986, 1988–1989)

9 seasons 
Wieslaw Janczyk (1959–1961, 1963–1968)
Kazimierz Kowalec (1964–1972)
Czeslaw Plaskota (1964–1972)

References

External links 
  Western Eagles FC official website
 Western Eagles Facebook Page
 Western Eagles page on OzFootball
 Football Federation Victoria

 
Association football clubs established in 1950
Soccer clubs in Melbourne
1950 establishments in Australia
Polish sports clubs in Australia
Polish association football clubs outside Poland
Sport in the City of Brimbank